The 2019 Anlas Czech Republic FIM Speedway Grand Prix was the third race of the 2019 Speedway Grand Prix season. It took place on June 14 at the Markéta Stadium in Prague, Czech Republic.

Riders 
First reserve Robert Lambert replaced the injured world champion Tai Woffinden, while second reserve Max Fricke replaced Greg Hancock. The Speedway Grand Prix Commission nominated Václav Milík as the wild card, and Zdeněk Holub and Ondřej Smetana both as Track Reserves.

Results 
The Grand Prix was won by Janusz Kołodziej, who beat Leon Madsen, Patryk Dudek and Jason Doyle in the final. Max Fricke had initially top scored with 12 points in the qualifying heats, however he was eliminated at the semi-final stage.

Dudek, who was joint-first with Bartosz Zmarzlik heading into the Grand Prix, scored two points less than Madsen. The result meant that Dudek and Madsen were now tied for first place in the overall standings with 40 points.

Heat details

Intermediate classification

References 

2019
Czech
2019 in Czech sport
June 2019 sports events in Europe